Gerhard Beyer (14 April 1941 – 29 October 2010) was a German sports shooter. He competed at the 1976 Summer Olympics and the 1984 Summer Olympics.

References

1941 births
2010 deaths
German male sport shooters
Olympic shooters of West Germany
Shooters at the 1976 Summer Olympics
Shooters at the 1984 Summer Olympics
Sportspeople from Berlin